Heber Gloria de Oliveira (born March 11, 1983) is a Brazilian football player.

References
FC Tokyo

1983 births
Living people
Brazilian footballers
J1 League players
FC Tokyo players
Rio Branco Esporte Clube players
Figueirense FC players
União São João Esporte Clube players
Clube de Regatas Brasil players
Santa Cruz Futebol Clube players
Sociedade Esportiva Palmeiras players
Associação Desportiva Cabofriense players
Brazilian expatriate footballers
Expatriate footballers in Japan
Association football midfielders